Friedrich Ritter (9 May 1898 – 9 April 1989) was a German botanist who collected and described many species of cacti.  Ritterocereus is named in his honour.

References 

1898 births
1989 deaths